Bakoa is a genus of plants in the family Araceae. It has three known species, all endemic to the island of Borneo.

Bakoa brevipedunculata (H.Okada & Y.Mori) S.Y.Wong - Kalimantan
Bakoa lucens (Bogner) P.C.Boyce & S.Y.Wong - Sarawak
Bakoa nakamotoi S.Y.Wong - Kalimantan

References

Endemic flora of Borneo
Aroideae
Araceae genera